Coleophora dendroidis is a moth of the family Coleophoridae.

The larvae feed on Caroxylon dendroides. They feed on the generative organs of their host plant.

References

dendroidis
Moths described in 1989